Toikka is a Finnish surname.

Geographical distribution
As of 2014, 90.1% of all known bearers of the surname Toikka were residents of Finland (frequency 1:3,461), 3.2% of the United States (1:6,337,742), 3.1% of Estonia (1:24,475) and 1.1% of Sweden (1:518,251) and 1.0% of Canada (1:2,164,589).

In Finland, the frequency of the surname was higher than national average (1:3,461) in the following regions:
 1. Kymenlaakso (1:372)
 2. South Karelia (1:693)
 3. Uusimaa (1:3,095)

People
Oiva Toikka, Finnish glass designer
Markku Toikka, Finnish comedian
Valmari Toikka (1902–1990), Finnish skier

References

Surnames of Finnish origin
Finnish-language surnames